Pibanga is a genus of longhorn beetles of the subfamily Lamiinae, containing the following species:

 Pibanga costulata (Belon, 1896)
 Pibanga diamantina Galileo & Martins, 1995
 Pibanga glabricula (Bates, 1885)
 Pibanga itacoatiara Galileo & Martins, 1995
 Pibanga jacareacanga Galileo & Martins, 1995
 Pibanga ochropyga (Belon, 1896)
 Pibanga transversefasciata (Breuning, 1943)

References

Eupromerini